Christopher Voth (born ) is a Canadian male volleyball player. He is part of the Canada men's national volleyball team. On club level he played left side for Abiant Lycurgus. Voth is openly gay and came out as the first openly gay national athlete from Canada.

References

External links
 profile at FIVB.org

1990 births
Canadian men's volleyball players
Canadian LGBT sportspeople
Gay sportsmen
Living people
LGBT volleyball players
LGBT Mennonites
Canadian gay men
21st-century Canadian LGBT people